Hugh Downie Gilshan (born 7 July 1945) was a Scottish footballer who played as a winger, Gilshan is best known for his time with St Mirren where he made 74 appearances from 1968 to 1971. He also played for Johnstone Burgh.

References

1945 births
Living people
Scottish footballers
St Mirren F.C. players
Association football wingers
Place of birth missing (living people)